The 1926 Auburn Tigers football team represented Auburn University in the 1926 college football season. The Tigers' were led by head coach Dave Morey in his second season and finished the season with a record of five wins and four losses (5–4 overall, 3–3 in the SoCon).

Schedule

References

Auburn
Auburn Tigers football seasons
Auburn Tigers football